Ridhima Dilawari is an Indian golfer.

In January 2020 Dilawari won the first leg of the 2020 Hero Women's Pro Golf Tour.

References

Indian female golfers
Golfers at the 2018 Asian Games
Living people
21st-century Indian women
Year of birth missing (living people)